Highway 38 is an arterial road in the low plains of Judea in Israel. It serves as the main access route to Beit Shemesh and as a main north–south route in the region. Along the route are many nature preserves and archeological sites.

Route
Highway 38 travels in a north-northeast direction as it winds through the western foothills of the Judaean Mountains from Highway 35 at Nehusha Junction near Beit Guvrin to Highway 1 at Sha'ar HaGai Interchange.

Along many stretches, it follows small valleys formed by northward turns of westward streams emanating from the mountains to the east, notably, the Yoresh, Hakhlil, Yarmut and Kisalon Streams. Between the stream valleys and north of Eshtaol the road rises and falls as it crosses the many east–west ridges.

History

During the Roman Era, the road was an important route as evidenced by milestones found near Givat Yeshayahu as part of the road from Ashkelon via Highway 35 to Beit Guvrin, northward along Highway 38, then westward via the Elah Valley to Jerusalem.

In 1948, the Latrun section of Highway 1 was taken over by Jordan. Traffic between Tel Aviv and Jerusalem was diverted to a new route called "Kvish HaGvura" (Road of Bravery) of which Highway 38 served as the connection between Highway 44 at Shimshon Junction and Highway 1 at Sha'ar HaGai. This section of the road was straightened and widened in 1960.

At the end of 2012, the National Roads Company of Israel published tenders to upgrade the northern section of the road creating a divided highway with two lanes in each direction between Beit Shemesh and Sha'ar HaGai. The government granted approval on 6 June 2013. The approval was made through the special "Housing Cabinet" since the road's expansion is a condition for plans to build an additional apartments and homes in Beit Shemesh.

The newly rebuilt highway costing 800M shekels was inaugurated in September, 2017. Bridge interchanges at Naham/Hartuv, Shimshon Junction/Eshtaol and Mesilat Zion with tunnel interchanges at the Sha'ar HaGai Caravanserai and the Burma Road were completed. A wildlife bridge was built near Mesilat Zion and the road was raised to overpass the railway tracks at Beit Shemesh. The road includes highway lighting and bicycle paths along its entire length. The upgrade of the once relatively unsafe road into a modern highway will significantly cut travel time between Beit Shemesh and Tel Aviv or Jerusalem and allow the area's population to grow significantly.

Junctions & Interchanges (south to north)

References

See also 
List of highways in Israel

38